Ado Kurvits (1897–1958) was an Estonian Communist politician who was the chairman of the Executive Committee of Tallinn from February to September 1945. He was deported after the Soviet Union invaded Estonia in 1940. Despite this, he was the first chairman after the Soviet Union reconquered Estonia from the Nazi German occupation of Estonia, and was chairman during the official end of World War II. He was succeeded by Aleksander Hendrikson. He died in 1958 and is buried at Helme cemetery in Valga County.

See also
List of mayors of Tallinn

References

1897 births
1958 deaths
People from Valga County
Politicians from Tallinn
Mayors of Tallinn
Communist Party of Estonia politicians
20th-century Estonian politicians